The following are the national records in athletics in Belgium maintained by its Athletics Federation: / (LRBA/KBAB).

Outdoor

Key to tables:

+ = en route to a longer distance

h = hand timing

X = not recognised because of doping violation

Men

Women

Mixed

Indoor

Men

Women

References
General
Belgian Outdoor Records – Men 11 November 2022 updated
Belgian Outdoor Records – Women 2 September 2022 updated
Belgian Indoor Records – Men 11 February 2023 updated
Belgian Indoor Records – Women 4 February 2023 updated
Specific

External links
VAL web site 
LBFA web site 

Belgian
Records
Athletics
Athletics